Gianni Bonichon (13 October 1944 – 3 January 2010) was an Italian bobsledder who competed in the late 1960s and early 1970s. He won the silver medal in the four-man event at the 1972 Winter Olympics in Sapporo.

Bonichon was born in Nus and died in Aosta, on 3 January 2010.

References
 Ansa.it article on Bonichon's death. - accessed 3 January 2010. 
 Bobsleigh four-man Olympic medalists for 1924, 1932-56, and since 1964
 DatabaseOlympics.com profile

1944 births
2010 deaths
Bobsledders at the 1972 Winter Olympics
Italian male bobsledders
Olympic bobsledders of Italy
Olympic silver medalists for Italy
Olympic medalists in bobsleigh
Medalists at the 1972 Winter Olympics